The men's pole vault at the 2011 European Athletics U23 Championships was held at the Městský stadion on 14 and 16 July.

Medalists

Schedule

Results

Qualification
Qualification: Qualification Performance 5.35 (Q) or at least 12 best performers advanced to the final.

Final

Participation
According to an unofficial count, 21 athletes from 13 countries participated in the event.

References

External links

Pole M
Pole vault at the European Athletics U23 Championships